Sculptor is a small and faint constellation in the southern sky. It represents a sculptor. It was introduced by Nicolas Louis de Lacaille in the 18th century. He originally named it Apparatus Sculptoris (the sculptor's studio), but the name was later shortened.

History

The region to the south of Cetus and Aquarius had been named by Aratus in 270 BC as The Waters – an area of scattered faint stars with two brighter stars standing out. Professor of astronomy Bradley Schaefer has proposed that these stars were most likely Alpha and Delta Sculptoris.

The French astronomer Nicolas-Louis de Lacaille first described the constellation in French as l'Atelier du Sculpteur (the sculptor's studio) in 1751–52, depicting a three-legged table with a carved head on it, and an artist's mallet and two chisels on a block of marble alongside it. De Lacaille had observed and catalogued almost 10,000 southern stars during a two-year stay at the Cape of Good Hope, devising fourteen new constellations in uncharted regions of the Southern Celestial Hemisphere not visible from Europe. He named all but one in honour of instruments that symbolised the Age of Enlightenment.

Characteristics

Sculptor is a small constellation bordered by Aquarius and Cetus to the north, Fornax to the east, Phoenix to the south, Grus to the southwest, and Piscis Austrinus to the west. The bright star Fomalhaut is nearby. The three-letter abbreviation for the constellation, as adopted by the International Astronomical Union in 1922, is "Scl". The official constellation boundaries, as set by Belgian astronomer Eugène Delporte in 1930, are defined by a polygon of 6 segments. The whole constellation is visible to observers south of latitude 50°N.

Notable features

Stars

No stars brighter than 3rd magnitude are located in Sculptor. This is explained by the fact that Sculptor contains the south galactic pole where stellar density is very low. Overall, there are 56 stars within the constellation's borders brighter than or equal to apparent magnitude 6.5.

The brightest star is Alpha Sculptoris, an SX Arietis-type variable star with a spectral type B7IIIp and an apparent magnitude of 4.3. It is 780 ± 30 light-years distant from Earth.

Eta Sculptoris is a red giant of spectral type M4III that varies between magnitudes 4.8 and 4.9, pulsating with multiple periods of 22.7, 23.5, 24.6, 47.3, 128.7 and 158.7 days. Estimated to be around 1,082 times as luminous as the Sun, it is 460 ± 20 light-years distant from Earth.

R Sculptoris is a red giant that has been found to be surrounded by spirals of matter likely ejected around 1800 years ago. It is 1,440 ± 90 light-years distant from Earth.

The Astronomical Society of Southern Africa in 2003 reported that observations of the Mira variable stars T, U, V and X Sculptoris were very urgently needed as data on their light curves was incomplete.

Deep sky objects
The constellation also contains the Sculptor Dwarf, a dwarf galaxy which is a member of the Local Group, as well as the Sculptor Group, the group of galaxies closest to the Local Group. The Sculptor Galaxy (NGC 253), a barred spiral galaxy and the largest member of the group, lies near the border between Sculptor and Cetus. Another prominent member of the group is the irregular galaxy NGC 55.

One unique galaxy in Sculptor is the Cartwheel Galaxy, at a distance of 500 million light-years. The result of a merger around 300 million years ago, the Cartwheel Galaxy has a core of older, yellow stars, and an outer ring of younger, blue stars, which has a diameter of 100,000 light-years. The smaller galaxy in the collision is now incorporated into the core, after moving from a distance of 250,000 light-years. The shock waves from the collision sparked extensive star formation in the outer ring.

Namesakes
Sculptor (AK-103) was a United States Navy Crater class cargo ship named after the constellation.

See also
 Sculptor (Chinese astronomy)

References
Notes

Citations

Sources

External links 

 The Deep Photographic Guide to the Constellations: Sculptor
 The clickable Sculptor

 
Southern constellations
Constellations listed by Lacaille